Tripsacum dactyloides, commonly called eastern gamagrass, or Fakahatchee grass, is a warm-season, sod-forming bunch grass. It is widespread in the Western Hemisphere, native from the eastern United States to northern South America. Its natural habitat is in sunny moist areas, such as along watercourses and in wet prairies. In some areas, it has adapted well to disturbed conditions.

Eastern gamagrass is a widely cultivated for its use as forage.

Description
Tripsacum dactyloides is one of the species in the family Poaceae, tribe Andropogoneae, and subtribe Tripsacinae. As the plant is a distant relative of corn, it shares common subtribes with the Zea mays corn species.

Roots: Eastern gamagrass has several short, fibrous, thick rhizomes. Eastern gamagrass can survive droughts and floods for a long time because of its rigid and thick rhizomatous roots which firmly holding the plant upright. The deep and hollow roots of the plant branch out from lower nodes.

Leaves: Since the grass has short internodes, all the leaves grow out from the plant's base.
The stems and leaves have a purplish color and are glabrous.

Flowers: The flowers of eastern gamagrass, which blooms from late March to early October, consist of spikes made up of female and male spikelets. Tripsacum dactyloides has separate female and male flowers on the same individual making it a monoecious plant. The type of inflorescence is usually a single raceme or a panicle with a combination of two to three unisexual single racemes.

Fruits: The seed-producing season of the grass is from June to September. The seeds mature disproportionally and production is commonly slow. The joints of the seedhead break into two as the fruit matures and each seed-bearing part contains one seed. The size of the seedhead can range from 6 to 10 inches. Usually spikelets of grass assist reproduction by holding the grain and fruit. When the mature female spikelets are destroyed they separate like pop-beads.

Distribution
Tripsacum dactyloides is widely spread throughout the United States, from Connecticut to Nebraska and south to Florida and Texas. It is also found  as far south as South America, in Paraguay and Brazil. The plant has been cultivated outside of its native range in the southwestern United States and elsewhere.

Cultivation
The best growing conditions for eastern gamagrass are provided by wet land, such as floodplains along riverbanks. Moreover, moist, nonalkaline lowland areas will maintain the growth of gamagrass because the land can endure a longer time under flood conditions.

Tripsacum dactyloides can tolerate a maximum of three weeks of flooding without dying. The deep roots, which extend to around  underground, are the key structure that allows gamagrass to tolerate drought.

Uses
Eastern gamagrass was widely considered a high class feedcrop among the early settlers of the United States. However, it started to disappear because of grain crops and cattle grazing. Around the late 1980s and early 1990s, people started to pay attention again to eastern gamagrass as a good productive forage in summer, since it is productive, palatable and easily digestible by almost all cattle. For these reasons, gamagrass is ideally suitable for feed crops, including hay and pasture forage for which rotation of grazing seasons is controlled. It is used as forage because the growing season of the grass is earlier compared to other warm-season grasses and later compared to cool-season grass and legumes. Eastern gamagrass requires a moderate amount of carbohydrates stored in the leaf bases for regrowth. If the plant is grazed before carbohydrate accumulates in the leaf bases the plant will die from overgrazing.

Gamagrass is also suitable as a wildlife habitat. Hollow space in the middle of dispersed bundles and the tented canopy created by the leaves growing from the rhizomes and dropping into the middle make the plant an attractive location for wildlife. For example, the empty space in the middle of bundles is large enough for wild animals like quails and prairie chickens to build nests. Moreover, the grass provides good cover during the winter for grassland sparrows.

Gamagrass grows from mid-April to mid-September. This is a little earlier in the year compared to other native warm-season grasses like big bluestem, (Andropogon gerardi) and switch grass, (Panicum virgatum). The high relative yield of gamagrass in summer is the major reason why this grass is a good feedcrop when cool-season grasses ("tall fescue") are undeveloped.

Genetics
Hybrids have been created by combining Zea mays and the octoploid (2n = 72) form of T. dactyloides.

References

dactyloides
Bunchgrasses of North America
Warm-season grasses of North America
Grasses of Mexico
Grasses of the United States
Native grasses of the Great Plains region
Native grasses of Oklahoma
Native grasses of Texas
Flora of the Eastern United States
Plants described in 1753
Taxa named by Carl Linnaeus